Ernst Balz (24 February 1904 – 31 December 1945) was a German sculptor. His work was part of the sculpture event in the art competition at the 1936 Summer Olympics. He went missing in action during World War II, and was declared dead on 31 December 1945.

References

1904 births
1945 deaths
People from Hohenlohe (district)
German military personnel killed in World War II
Missing in action of World War II
20th-century German sculptors
20th-century German male artists
Olympic competitors in art competitions
Nazi Party members